Marehill is a hamlet in the Horsham District of West Sussex, England. It lies on the A283 road 0.6 miles (1 km) east of Pulborough.

External links

Horsham District
Villages in West Sussex